"You're a Grand Old Flag" is an American patriotic march. The song, a spirited march written by George M. Cohan, is a tribute to the U.S. flag. In addition to obvious references to the flag, it incorporates snippets of other popular songs, including one of his own. Cohan wrote it in 1906 for his stage musical George Washington, Jr.

History
The song was first publicly performed on February 6, the play's opening night, at Herald Square Theater in New York City. "You're a Grand Old Flag" quickly became the first song from a musical to sell over a million copies of sheet music. The title and first lyric comes from someone Cohan once met; the Library of Congress website notes. "You're a Grand Old Flag" would go on to become one of the most popular U.S. marching-band pieces of all time.

In the play itself, the scene with the Civil War soldier was replicated. The soldier's comment was the lead-in to this song. Thus, the first version of the chorus began, "You're a grand old rag / You're a high-flying flag". Despite Cohan's efforts to pull that version, some artists such as Billy Murray had recorded it under its original title, "The Grand Old Rag", in advance of the play's opening, and copies under that title still circulate among collectors. Cohan's second attempt at writing the chorus began, "You're a grand old flag / Though you're torn to a rag". The final version, with its redundant rhyme, is as shown below.

Today, many different arrangements of the song exist. In particular, Paul V. Yoder's 1954 arrangement of "You're a Grand Old Flag" is a version commonly used today by the U.S. military in its performances of the song.

Uses
The song is often performed by marching bands on Flag Day, as the holiday is intended to celebrate the national flag of the United States

Lyrics

Verse 1
There's a feeling comes a-stealing,
And it sets my brain a-reeling,
When I'm list'ning to the music of a military band.
Any tune like "Yankee Doodle"
Simply sets me off my noodle,
It's that patriotic something that no one can understand.

"Way down South, in the land of cotton,"
Melody untiring,
Ain't that inspiring?

Hurrah! Hurrah! We'll join the jubilee!
And that's going some, for the Yankees, by gum!
Red, White and Blue, I am for you!
Honest, you're a grand old flag!
Verse 2
I'm no cranky hanky panky,
I'm a dead square, honest Yankee,
And I'm mighty proud of that old flag that flies for Uncle Sam.
Though I don't believe in raving
Ev'ry time I see it waving,
There's a chill runs up my back that makes me glad I'm what I am.

Here's a land with a million soldiers,
That's if we should need 'em,
We'll fight for freedom!

Hurrah! Hurrah! For ev'ry Yankee Tar,
And old G.A.R., ev'ry stripe, ev'ry star.
Red, White and Blue, hats off to you!
Honest, you're a grand old flag!
Chorus
You're a grand old flag,
You're a high-flying flag,
And forever in peace may you wave.
You're the emblem of the land I love,
The home of the free and the brave.
Ev'ry heart beats true
'Neath the Red, White and Blue,
Where there's never a boast or brag.
But should auld acquaintance be forgot,
Keep your eye on the grand old flag.

See also

 "The Stars and Stripes Forever"
Flag anthem

Other uses
The song has been modified for use as the fight song of the Melbourne Football Club who play in the Australian Football League, as well as by lower league clubs West Perth Football Club in the WAFL, Sturt Football Club and Norwood Football Club in the SANFL and  North Hobart Football Club.

References

External links

 1906 sheet music from the Library of Congress
 Billy Murray solo recording (as "The Grand Old Rag")
 Billy Murray and the American Quartet (as "You're a Grand Old Flag")

1906 songs
American patriotic songs
Billy Murray (singer) songs
Songs written by George M. Cohan
History of New York City
Songs from musicals
United States National Recording Registry recordings